Molla Avaz (also Romanized as Mollā ʿAvaẕ) is a village in Margan Rural District, in the Central District of Hirmand County, Sistan and Baluchestan Province, Iran. At the 2006 census, its population was 46, in 9 families.

References 

Populated places in Hirmand County